Dilip Harel Mitra Chenoy (born 22 June 1958)  was appointed Secretary General of FICCI, a leading industry body in India, in April 2018. He was earlier the Managing Director & CEO of National Skill Development Corporation (NSDC), a public-private partnership formed under Section 25 of the Companies Act 1956, from 7 May 2010 to 8 October 2015.

Early life and education 
Chenoy was born on 22 June 1958. He completed his schooling (Indian School Certificate) from Hyderabad Public School and graduated with a degree in Science (Hons.) with a major in Chemistry from Delhi University in 1980.

Career 
Chenoy spearheaded NSDC for 5 years which aims to skill 150 million Indians by 2022 and hence contributed in harnessing India's demographic dividend. Prior to NSDC, he was associated with Confederation of Indian Industry (CII) for 19 years and served as the Regional Director for Southern region. In 2004, he joined Society of Indian Automobile Manufacturers (SIAM) as Director General.

Personal life 
In 1983, Cheony married Shama Mitra Chenoy, who is a graduate of the Hindu College and completed her doctorate from Delhi University, with a specialization on Shahjahanabad. Shama is currently working as an associate professor at Delhi University.

Publications
Cheonyhas authored numerous articles in journals on environment, automotive industry as well as several newspaper articles on industry and skill development. 
 Chapter on Education and Health, a special focus addition on Uttar Pradesh – Leveraging the Demographic Dividend in Uttar Pradesh
 Public-Private Partnerships to Meet the Skills challenges in India, in Skills Development for Inclusive and Sustainable Growth in Developing Asia-Pacific (181 – 194). Asian Development Bank/Springer – 2013
 Skill Development in India - A Transformation in the Making, in India Infrastructure Report 2012 (pp 199-207), Routledge – 2012
 Skill Development in India: Moving from a supply-side model to Demand led interventions, in IILM Management Review Vol 1, Issue 1 – 2012
 Skill development coming of age in India on 7 December 2012 on adbskilldevelopment.wordpress.com 
 Business Today: 'Skills training will become more affordable and accessible' on 28 February 2013
 Industry support is critical on Peoplematters.in 
 Top 12 trends : Talent crunch & skill gap on Peoplematters.in
 The strategic shift required is on thinking of tomorrow on Peoplematters.in 
 It costs about 9000 to skill a person on Peoplematter.in

References 
 NSDC appoints Dilip Chenoy as CEO & MD
 Mr. Dilip Chenoy is currently Managing Director & CEO of the National Skill Development Corporation (NSDC)
 We need big companies to invest in this (skilling) space: Dilip Chenoy
 Dilip Chenoy one globe 2014 speaker
 Dilip, one of the speaker at The 15th Regulators & Policymakers Retreat 2014
 Skill enhancement is required for employability: Dilip Chenoy

Notes

1958 births
Living people
Delhi University alumni
Indian chief executives
Place of birth missing (living people)